Willy Claes (born 6 February 1937) is a Belgian weightlifter. He competed at the 1956 Summer Olympics and the 1960 Summer Olympics.

References

External links
 

1937 births
Living people
Belgian male weightlifters
Olympic weightlifters of Belgium
Weightlifters at the 1956 Summer Olympics
Weightlifters at the 1960 Summer Olympics
People from Saint-Gilles, Belgium
Sportspeople from Brussels
20th-century Belgian people